Charlie Byrne's is a bookshop located in the Cornstore Mall on Middle Street in Galway, close to Shop Street and the Augustinian Church. Considered a "cultural reference point" for Galwegians and visitors alike, it houses more than 100,000 new and used books. Writers often launch their books here. The Irish Times has described it as "the destination bookshop in Galway city".

History
Charlie Byrne's was founded in 1989, operating initially from a market stall in Munster Avenue and then moving to its first premises in Dominick Street later that year. Three years later it moved to its second premises and its first of two on Middle Street. In 1996, it moved across the road to its third premises overall and second on Middle Street, the same one from which it operates today. It continued to expand and by the early 2000s it had a 2000 square foot premises; it has by now largely taken over the Cornstore Mall.

Style
Charlie Byrne's is spread across multiple floors of the Cornstore.

It avails of publisher's overstock to provide new books at a reduced price, though these are carefully chosen. It sources books from university presses and foreign publishers to provide titles not otherwise often found in Irish bookshops. It typically only sells new full-priced books if the writer is local, or if the topic relates to Ireland. It has a warehouse in which it stores tens of thousands of additional books.

Its annual pop-up bookshop at the Town Hall Theatre during the Cúirt International Festival of Literature is another feature; visiting writers such as Edna O'Brien, John Banville, Seamus Heaney, Michael Longley, Ruth Padel, Manuel Rivas and Allen Ginsberg are among those to have spent hours signing books at the Cúirt shop's renowned antique desk.

Awards
Charlie Byrne's was awarded Best Bookshop in Ireland 2013/2014 in The Irish Times'''s Best Shops in Ireland Competition.

It was named Ireland's Best Independent Bookshop as part of the British and Irish Book Awards in 2019. The award is presented at ceremony in May in London by The Bookseller''.

References

External links
 Official website

Irish companies established in 1989
Bookstores established in the 20th century
Byrne, Charlie
Buildings and structures in Galway (city)
Retail companies established in 1989
Independent bookstores